Danil Irtishch  was a Lithuanian boyar, likely of Ruthenian ethnicity, alive during the late 15th and early 16th centuries. He was one of the paternal ancestors of Fyodor Dostoyevsky. In 1506, he received a vast land grant from his prince which included part of the village of Dostoevo, near the town of Pinsk.

References

15th-century Lithuanian nobility
16th-century Lithuanian nobility